Knut Hjeltnes may refer to:

 Knut Hjeltnes (athlete) (born 1951), Norwegian athlete
 Knut Hjeltnes (architect) (born 1961), Norwegian architect